EAK may refer to:
 Euro-Asia Air
 Evangelical Working Group of the CDU/CSU
 Kenya, license plate code